Louis Darragon (6 February 1883 – 28 April 1918) was a French professional cyclist who won the UCI Motor-paced World Championships in 1906 and 1907 and finished in second place in 1909 and 1911. He died in 1918 during a race at the Vélodrome d'hiver in Paris. The city stadium in his native Vichy is named after him.

References

1883 births
1918 deaths
French male cyclists
People from Vichy
UCI Track Cycling World Champions (men)
French track cyclists
Sportspeople from Allier
Cyclists who died while racing
Sport deaths in France
Cyclists from Auvergne-Rhône-Alpes